is a Japanese actor. Nakamura is a former Kabuki actor as well as his older brother Kinnosuke Nakamura. His first film appearance was in the 1955 film Furisode Kenpo. He won the award for best supporting actor at the 5th Japan Academy Prize and at the 6th Hochi Film Award for Kagero-za, Buriki no kunsho, and Shikake-nin Baian. 

In 2016, he appeared in the  Martin Scorsese's film Silence.

Filmography
 Furisode Kenpo (1955)
 Stepbrothers (1957)
 Akō Rōshi (1961)
 Kwaidan (1965) - (segment "Hoichi the Earless")
 Samurai Banners (1969)
 Shinsengumi (1969)
 Bakumatsu (1970)
Zatoichi in Desperation (1972)
 Shin Hissatsu Shiokinin (1977)
 Nichiren (1979)
 Tempyō no Iraka (1980)
 Buriki no kunsho (1981)
 Kagero-za (1981)
 Shikake-nin Baian (1981)
 Ōoku (1983)
 Station to Heaven (1984)
 Shinran: Path to Purity (1987)
 Tokyo: The Last Megalopolis (1988)
 Whiteout (2000)
 Godzilla vs. Megaguirus (2000)
 Warm Water Under a Red Bridge (2001)
 Godzilla, Mothra and King Ghidorah: Giant Monsters All-Out Attack (2001)
 Godzilla Against Mechagodzilla (2002)
 Samurai Resurrection (2003)
 Be with You (2004)
 Steamboy (2004)
 Dororo (2007)
 Sad Vacation (2007)
 20th Century Boys (2008)
 Snow Prince (2009)
 Ask This of Rikyu (2013)
 Kakekomi (2015)
 Silence (2016)

References

1938 births
Japanese male actors
Living people
People from Tokyo